Koshi Refreshment Centre is a project in Koshi province, Nepal, which is being constructed under Koshi Government. It lies on Mahendra Highway in Sunsari District. Its construction was started in 24 January 2020 by the then chief minister Sher Dhan Rai.

Background 
First CM of Koshi province had planned the construction in 2018 but the site was not fixed. Initiatially it was planned to be opened in Jhapa but later it was decided to take in Sunsari District at Koshi Rural Municipality.

The then Chief Minister Sherdhan Rai-led government had set up a separate office for the construction of the Koshi Refreshment Center in the Koshi Katan area of ​​the Koshi Rural Municipality of Sunsari as a multi-year project.But the office was later dissolved.The office of the center was canceled by the state cabinet meeting held on Sunday. Although the office was canceled, the project was not canceled. Now Urban Development Office Morang will look after the construction of Koshi Refreshment Center.

References

Koshi Province
Nepal
Construction